James Carew Rosapepe (born May 20, 1951) is an American politician from Maryland and a member of the Democratic Party. He is currently serving in his third four-year term in the Maryland State Senate, representing Maryland's District 21 in Prince George's and Anne Arundel Counties. From 1998 to 2001, he served as the United States Ambassador to Romania.

Background
Rosapepe was born in Rome, Italy. He was first elected to the Maryland House of Delegates in 1986, serving 2 full and one partial terms before being appointed as Ambassador to Romania in early 1998 during the Clinton administration. An internal State Department report was strongly critical of Rosapepe's leadership and management during this ambassadorial service, while crediting him with several accomplishments. Upon his recall from Romania, Rosapepe was appointed to serve on the Board of Regents of the University System of Maryland. He left that board to run against incumbent Senator John Giannetti in District 21.

In the legislature
Rosapepe defeated the incumbent senator, John Giannetti, in the 2006 election for Maryland State Senator in District 21. Giannetti had been accused of being too conservative by many Democrats, specifically for his position against an assault weapons ban in Maryland. After his defeat in the primary election, Giannetti switched parties to run against Rosapepe as a Republican, and was again defeated.

Rosapepe currently serves as vice chair of the Senate Budget and Taxation Committee and is a member of the Joint COVID-19 Response Legislative Workgroup. He was unopposed in the 2010, 2014, and 2018 elections.

References

 Jim Rosapepe is also co-author of

Notes

1951 births
American people of Italian descent
Democratic Party Maryland state senators
Living people
Ambassadors of the United States to Romania
Democratic Party members of the Maryland House of Delegates
Politicians from Rome
Italian emigrants to the United States
21st-century American politicians